Clan name may refer to:

Chinese clan name, one of two types of ancient Chinese surnames distinct from the ancestral name (姓, xing)
Mongolian clan name, a portion of a Mongolian name
Roman clan name, a common element of Latin names, usually the second name following the praenomen and before the cognomen
Scottish clan, a geographically-based system of family groupings (and, historically, of government) in Scotland
Xhosa clan name, a respectful way of referring to a Xhosa person, after the name of a prominent ancestor

See also
Clan, for a broad historical perspective